Háskólatorg is one of the buildings that make up the Reykjavík campus of the University of Iceland.  Construction was completed in 2007 and the building now serves as the social centre of the University, housing a cafeteria, a bookstore and as of 2013 a student pub.

University of Iceland
Buildings and structures in Reykjavík